Sequoyah Lake is a reservoir in the U.S. state of Georgia.

Sequoyah Lake was named after Sequoyah (1767–1843), an Indian silversmith and inventor of the Cherokee syllabary. Variant names are "Lake Sequoyah" and "Sequoia Lake".

References

Landforms of Pickens County, Georgia
Reservoirs in Georgia (U.S. state)